The 2019–20 season was a FC Yerevan's first season back in the Armenian Premier League since their re-formation in July 2018.

Season events
On 5 September, Nebojša Petrović was relieved of his duties as Yerevan's manager, with Assistant Coach Georgi Ghazaryan being placed in temporary charge for Yerevans games against Lori on 13 September. On 16 September, Vlad Goian was appointed as Manager on a one-year contract,  before being relieved of his duties and replaced by António Caldas on 4 October.. Caldas then resigned on 11 November 2019 following a 7-2 defeat to Ararat-Armenia.

In February 2020, the clubs Facebook page stated that instead of preparing for the end of the winter break, the club was preparing for court hearings.

On 21 February, the Football Federation of Armenia announced that FC Yerevan had withdrawn from the league due to financial and technical problems.

Squad

Transfers

In

Loans in

Out

Released

Competitions

Armenian Premier League

Results summary

Results

Table

Armenian Cup

Statistics

Appearances and goals

|-
|colspan="16"|Players away on loan:
|-
|colspan="16"|Players who left Yerevan during the season:

|}

Goal scorers

Disciplinary Record

References

FC Yerevan
Yerevan